The NV Arena is a football stadium located in Sankt Pölten, Lower Austria, Austria. It is the home stadium of SKN St. Pölten. It was built from January 2011 to July 2012, and opened on 7 July 2012. The capacity is 8,000 (extendible to 13,000 spectators).
The stadium has hosted the Austrian Football League championship final (Austrian Bowl) several times.

References

SKN St. Pölten
Sports venues completed in 2012
Football venues in Austria
Sports venues in Lower Austria
American football venues in Austria
2012 establishments in Austria
21st-century architecture in Austria